Lorong Waktu (literally translated as The Time Passage) is an Indonesian Islamic religious science fiction television series created by Deddy Mizwar and directed by Abdul Kadir, Aldisar Syafar and Deddy Mizwar himself with scenario written by Wahyu H.S. It stars Deddy Mizwar, Jourast Jordy, Hefri Olifian, Christy Jusung and Opie Kumis. The storyline revolves around the adventures of time travel by Haji Husin and his student Zidan through a sophisticated time machine created by Ustād Addin. This series was produced by Demi Gisela Citra Sinema and aired by SCTV in 1999 to coincide with the month of Ramadan 1420 Hijri. After the success of its first season, the series was continued in five other seasons for a total of 207 episodes until its final broadcast in 2006. In 2019, the series was remade in an animated format with the same title and aired during the month of Ramadan regularly by SCTV.

Together with the Keluarga Cemara and Si Doel Anak Sekolahan, Lorong Waktu is often referred to as the golden masterpiece from the Indonesian television series.

Premise

Lorong Waktu tells the adventures of Ustād Addin, Haji Husin and a young student named Zidan. Ustād Addin is a young orphan who is considered a child by Haji Husin and have skills in information technology. He then invented a time machine which then took Haji Husin and Zidan on an adventure through the past or the future.

In the second season, there are two new characters, a former thief named Havid and a former fortune-teller named Sabrina. Havid is illiterate but has the intention of repenting and wants to change his fate to become a good person. Meanwhile, Sabrina was previously met by Haji Husin and Zidan in the time tunnel before they met each other in the real world. Over time, Ustād Addin had an interest in Sabrina and vice versa until they finally decided to get married at the end of the season. Their moment of consent was aired in the first episode of the third season.

On their way through the passage of time in the third season, Haji Husin and Zidan and their students encounter various events and unique characters who indirectly provide lessons in living the values of a better life. Meanwhile, two students of Haji Husin who also served as mosque administrators, Havid and Jambrong fell in love with the same girl. The daily life of the mosque is filled with various tricks to compete for the love of the girl named Adinda. At the end of the season, Adinda finally chose Havid as her husband.

At the start of the fourth season, Sabrina, the wife of Ustād Addin, became pregnant and became very sensitive. As a responsible husband and father-to-be, Ustād Addin tries to fulfill his wife's cravings. At the end of this season another surprise emerged. A former prisoner who is also a friend of Jambrong and Havid named Jagur begged to become a student of Haji Husin and expressed his intention to repent. Haji Husin accepts, but Havid and Jambrong are still worried because Jagur is a former criminal. But they were wrong, because Jagur really sincerely repented and to prove it he even asked Zidan to remove the tattoo on his arm.

In the fifth season, Havid and Jambrong, who are both married, received new assignments as plantation managers funded by a mosque foundation. Jagur takes over as mosque keeper. Ustād Addin modernized his time machine equipment controlled via laptop and he can send his friends anytime and anywhere as long as his colleagues are using the devices he has developed. Sabrina gave birth a boy who was named Firdaus.

For the sixth or final season, the Lorong Waktu story focuses more on family issues. Firdaus, son of Ustād Addin and Sabrina, has now entered school age and Sabrina is preoccupied with her son's naughty behavior. Haji Husin is still hoping to remarry again as he is getting older and now all his favorite students are left to taking care of their respective families. He then meet to a woman named Aini and hoped this would be the last port of his heart. Meanwhile, Havid and Jambrong have now succeeded in building a plantation funded by a mosque foundation and Jagur, who just got married, wants to try to build his little family happily.

Cast

Main characters

 Haji Husin — The origin of Haji Husin is unknown. In the second episode of the first season, when he was young, he had been a cook in the pre-independence era of Indonesia. He is a mosque keeper who has several students including Ustād Addin, Zidan, Sabrina, Havid, Jagur and Jambrong. His wife is said to have passed away. In one of the episodes in the second season, Haji Husin's best friend, Kyai Firman, gave a clue that Haji Husin was a repentant before he went pilgrimage and decided to deepen his knowledge of Islam. Haji Husin is played by Deddy Mizwar from the first season to the sixth season.
 Ustād Addin — Haji Husin's adopted son. An orphan since he was a child, he received guidance from Haji Husin as well as received formal education until he became a computer engineer. He is a time tunnel program inventor and developer. He is married to a former fortune-teller named Sabrina. Ustād Addin was played by Adjie Pangestu in the first season, Dicky Chandra in the second season and Hefri Olifian from the third season to the sixth season.
 Zidan — A student in a madrasa run by Haji Husin and Ustād Addin. He was accidentally involved in the time machine project because he hid in Ustād Addin's laboratory until then Ustād Addin accidentally sent him to 1945 before being helped by Haji Husin. Zidan is close friends with Havid and Jambrong. Zidan is played by Jourast Jordy from the first season to the sixth season.
 Sabrina — A former paranormal and fortune-teller who was originally met by Haji Husin and Zidan in the time tunnel. He was almost killed by robbers who were about to enter his house before being helped by Haji Husin and Zidan. At first, Haji Husin, who was a widower, had a crush on Sabrina before he saw that it turned out that his student, Ustād Addin, also had a crush on Sabrina. Haji Husin then relented. Sabrina then married Ustād Addin and had one child. Sabrina is played by Christy Jusung from season two to four, Aditya Novika in season five and Zaskia Adya Mecca in season six.
 Havid — A former thief who repented and became a student of Haji Husin. In the first few episodes of the second season, Havid tries to hide the fact that he is illiterate and cannot counting. He finally couldn't hide it when Haji Husin found that he was unable to give change to the buyer of the mosque cooperative. In the third season, Havid met his future wife, Adinda, who had previously been targeted by Jambrong. Havid's character was played by Opie Kumis from season two to season six.
 Jambrong — A former preman who repents and becomes a student of Haji Husin. A good friend of Havid and Jagur, he began to be included in the storyline in the third season and had a chance to compete with Havid for Adinda. He later married Vira. Jambrong was played by Ramdhani Qubil AJ from season three to season six.
 Jagur — A former criminal convict who repents and becomes a student of Haji Husin. At the beginning of his appearance, he was rejected by former friends, Havid and Jambrong. To prove his sincerity to repent, Jagur asked Zidan to remove his tattoo. Asrul Dahlan played Jagur's character from the end of the fourth season to the sixth season with a distinctive Batak accent due to the actor's hometown origin.

Supporting characters
 Aura — An orphan girl who had a crush on Ustād Addin in the first season. He competes with Lestari who also likes Ustād Addin. But for one reason or another these two girls were not chosen by Ustād Addin to be his wife. Played by Lenia Masagantha.
 Lestari — A girl who had a crush on Ustād Addin in season one. He competes with Aura who also likes Ustād Addin. But for one reason or another these two girls were not chosen by Ustaz Addin to be his wife. Played by Irma Safitri.
 Intan — A girl who is a friend of Ustād Addin since he was a child. He was asked by Ustād Addin to pretend to be his girlfriend to make Sabrina jealous. Not wanting to be a big problem, Intan finally told Sabrina what really happened and asked Ustād Addin to apologize to Sabrina. He then appeared as Sabrina's companion in marriage proposal ceremony conducted by Ustād Addin. The character Intan only appeared in the second season and was played by Fitri Kurnia.
 Zidan's Parents — Zidan's father works as an engineer, while Zidan's mother is a housewife. In the second season, it was explained that Zidan's mother was a village head, indicating that her husband was a civil servant. Zidan's father character was played by Diaz Erlangga in season one to three, Hedi Yunus in season four and Tabah Penemuan in season five. While the character of Zidan's mother is played by Anggia Jelita.
 Zidan's Grandparents — Appears in the fourth episode of the first season. They feeling annoyed at Zidan's father and mother for rarely visiting them. The characters of Zidan's grandparents are played by Wingky Harun and Indriana Indriyanti.
 Kyai Firman — A senior cleric who became a teacher of repentance from Haji Husin. He also became the unofficial adoptive parent of Sabrina and brought her together with Haji Husin and later Ustād Addin. Played by Eman Sulaiman.
 Adinda — Havid's wife, appeared for the first time in the third season and was also crushed by Jambrong. Played by Irma De Vanty from season three to season five and Irma Annisa in season six.
 Jamil and his wife — Adinda's parents. Jamil himself was a close friend of Haji Husin when they were young. Jamil's character appeared in the third season and was played by Gito Rollies while his wife's character was played by Elly Ermawati.
 Vira — Jambrong's wife, appeared since the fifth season. Together with Adinda, he is entrusted with managing a food court that is managed by the mosque foundation. The character Vira is played by Ayu Pratiwi in the fifth season and Mega Yunia in the sixth season.
 Sofia — Sister of Zidan's mother. Having domestic problems with her husband that led to divorce before her husband asked her to reconcile. Haji Husin intends to help her in this matter by asking her to get married so that she can remarry her ex-husband again. Played by Inneke Koesherawati.
 Jardin — Jambrong's friend who asked for consultation with Haji Husin for writing a book. He had a crush on Sabrina which made Jambrong remind him that Sabrina was married. Jardin's character only appeared in the third season and was played by Agus Kuncoro.
 Firdaus — Son of Ustād Addin and Sabrina. First appeared in the fifth season as a baby. He was later explained to have become an elementary school student in the sixth season. Ferdiansyah played the baby Fidaus character while little Firdaus was played by Emir Alviandri Akram.
 Jagur's mother — Appeared in the fifth season. He came because his son asked him to propose to Annisa. He brought a 'souvenir' which was then also used as a dowry for his son, namely a gold bar. This character is played by Cut Harilda with a distinctive Batak accent even though actress Cut Harilda originally came from Aceh.
 Annisa — Jambrong's younger sister. Married Jagur in the fifth season and helped her husband manage the plantation business that was managed by the mosque foundation. Annisa's character is played by Linda Leona.
 Anjas — A plantation employee who is under the supervision of Havid and Jambrong. Has a physical disability, has difficulty speaking clearly and is too innocent. This character appeared in the fifth season and was played by Chairul Yusuf.
 Aini — An agricultural businesswoman who is interested in becoming a partner in the plantation managed by the trio of Havid, Jambrong and Jagur. Over time, due to frequent consultations with Haji Husin, the two became very close and Haji Husin's desire to make her a wife appeared, but Aini's parents thought that Haji Husin was too old. This character only appeared in the sixth season and was played by Cheche Kirani.
 Engkong Icung — A toy balloon seller who was kicked out by his wife because of household problems and then asked Haji Husin to accept him as a mosque caretaker. This character only appeared in the sixth season and was played by Sujarwo.

Other characters
 Superman — Appearing in one episode in the first season, is depicted as being old and planning to retire. Played by Pak Bendot.
 Prince Diponegoro — Appears in one episode in the first season, played by Andra PSP.
 Malin Kundang — Appeared in the 10th and 11th episodes of the second season, played by Septian Dwi Cahyo.
 Gadjah Mada — Appears in the 18th and 19th episodes of the second season, played by Diding Yacob.
 Husband and wife pithecanthropus erectus — Appears in the 19th episode in the second season, being told as the ancestor of Zidan's parents. Played by Diaz Erlangga and Anggia Jelita.
 Jaka Tarub — Appears in one episode in the second season, played by Fachrul Rozy.
 Nyi Roro Kidul — Appears in two episodes in the fourth season, played by Aldona Toncic.

Several actors and actresses have also played one-off characters for one or two episodes including Anwar Fuady, Rahman Yakob, Pietrajaya Burnama, Ujang Ronda, Ali Bustomi, Eddies Adelia, Rifat Sungkar, Rachel Amanda and Senandung Nacita.

Production

Development
Lorong Waktu is the first religious television series in Indonesia to develop the concept of science fiction. According to Deddy Mizwar, the basis for taking the storyline is based on Quran Sura Al-Asr which means time. So according to Deddy, the concept of the Lorong Waktu story is that all humans are at a loss, except those who always do good deeds to advise each other in truth and patience. Apart from that, another inspiration that forms the basis of this series is the Prophet Muhammad's Isra and Mi'raj. Many of the Prophet's companions did not believe that the Prophet could travel to Sidrat al-Muntaha in one night, but it turned out that it was possible if Allah allowed.

In writing the scenario for each episode, Deddy submitted it to Wahyu H.S. On the basis of the initiative, several other fictional sides were also added, such as Zidan meeting Prince Diponegoro, Superman and Malin Kundang. Of course, with the addition of a comedy plot so that the story can look interesting but still does not come out of the principle of da'wah.

Although not significant, some people consider Lorong Waktu to be inspired by mainstream works such as H. G. Wells' The Time Machine and Steven Spielberg's Back to the Future franchise. There is also a similarity in idea with the Quantum Leap in the 1990s which also used the idea of a time machine. Although the idea for the Lorong Waktu series may not be original, it is something new for the Indonesian television.

Abdul Kadir appeared as the director for this series in 20 episodes in the first season. This series then became his last film work before his death in 2000. From the 21st episode of the first season to the last episode in the sixth season, the directorial role was taken over by Aldisar Syafar with Deddy Mizwar who also directed several episodes if Aldisar was absent.

Casting
Of the six seasons of the Lorong Waktu series, only the character Haji Husin played by Deddy Mizwar and Zidan played by Jourast Jordy whose cast has remained the same from beginning to end. For Jourast Jordy, his role as Zidan is recognized as the opening for a successful career even though since 2012 he has resigned from acting. Jourast said he was offered the role of Zidan by Deddy Mizwar after placing second in the 1999 Abang None Cilik event and at that time he was not fluent in reading the script and needed to be taught by the production team.

The character of Ustād Addin has changed his cast several times. Adjie Pangestu, who previously played in Starvision's Mawar Sejati Mawar Berduri, appeared in the first season but due to his long contract with Prima Entertainment for Misteri Nini Pelet, he was unable to appear for the second season and was replaced by Dicky Chandra. Dicky himself chose to resign after the second season ended because 'his son did not want his father to act as a father to someone else' in connection with the storyline of Ustād Addin who married Sabrina in season three. Hefri Olifian was then chosen as the actor of Ustād Addin from season three to season six. Hefri himself at that time acted in Duk-Duk Mong with Jaja Mihardja and the rest he played in several television film productions.

The character Sabrina who appears in the second season is played by Christy Jusung. This character appeared as a substitute for the characters Aura and Lestari, played by Lenia Masagantha and Irma Safitri respectively, in the first season whose plot ended unclear even though in the last episode of the first season Ustād Addin had intended to choose one of them as a potential wife. As a 'competitor' for Sabrina, the character of Intan, played by Fitri Kurnia, was created. For Christy Jusung herself, the role of Sabrina was what made her name as an actress because previously she mostly played extras or cameo roles, especially in several episodes of Warkop Millenium. In the fifth season due to contract clause issues, the role of Christy was replaced by Aditya Novika. Because he played a Muslim character, Aditya kept herself from accepting model photo sessions for 'sexy clothes' and it is believed that this clause made Christy resign from Lorong Waktu because previously she had received an offer for a sexy role in the sitcom Sial-Sial Mujur. In the sixth season, the cast of Sabrina is filled by Zaskia Adya Mecca.

The addition of the character Havid, played by Opie Kumis, as a former thief who appears from the second season, becomes a pattern scheme that is repeated for the following seasons by giving rise to a new character which is a 'villain conversion'. In the third season, Jambrong, played by Ramdhani Qubil AJ, appeared as a former preman and in the last episode of the fourth season, Jagur, played by Asrul Dahlan, appeared as a former prisoner who later became one of the main characters for the fifth season. One characteristic for the addition of the characters of Haji Husin's students is their roles which are more comedic. For the three of them, participating as an actor in Lorong Waktu was felt to be a blessing. Opie Kumis, for example, has changed his life since he played Havid and the honorarium he received was then used to pay for his mother to go on the hajj pilgrimage. For Qubil and Asrul, their roles in Lorong Waktu lead them to higher careers in the acting field. Asrul himself remains an actor under the banner of Demi Gisela Citra Sinema with almost similar roles, especially for the series Para Pencari Tuhan.

Shooting location 

For the first season, the location for shooting Lorong Waktu uses the location at the Siti Rawani Mosque which is located in the Nusa Indah Raya Villa Complex, Jatiasih, Bekasi, West Java. In addition, Zidan's house area and other characters that appear in each episode also use the housing area in this complex.

From the second season to the sixth season, the shooting location moved to Baitussalam Grand Mosque, which is located in the Billy Moon Complex, Duren Sawit, East Jakarta. This mosque was chosen when one of Demi Gisela Citra Sinema's crew accidentally passed the location and then after going through Deddy Mizwar's consideration submitted a proposal for permission to use the mosque as a shooting location. At that time (2000), the mosque had just been renovated. Since being used as the location for Lorong Waktu, this mosque has received a new nickname as the Lorong Waktu Mosque. The room which is used as a time machine laboratory is a multipurpose room which when the mosque was renovated was left empty.

Several mosque administrators were also involved in this production as extras. One of the mosque administrators, Abdul Latief, said that apart from being an extra, he also had the opportunity to become a muezzin whose call to prayer was recorded and then used in episodes of this series.

Music
Anes Bali is the music director and composer of the main theme song for the first season and from the third season to the sixth season. He collaborated with singer Ina Bartheen. For the second season, the theme song used is the work of Chossy Pratama with singer Ayu Giri Anjani. To illustrate the music used in each episode itself alternates between Tikko Supratikwo, Koko Thole and Anes Bali himself.

Opening song
 Maka Jadilah — Used in the first season, created by Anes Bali and sung by Ina with Anes Bali.
 KepadaMu Allah — Used in the second season, by Chossy Pratama and sung by Ayu Giri Anjani.
 Karunia — Used in the third season, created by Anes Bali and sung by Ina with Anes Bali.
 Bening — Used in the fourth season, created by Anes Bali and sung by Ina with Anes Bali.
 Bismillah — Used in the fifth season, created by Anes Bali and sung by Ina with Anes Bali.
 Dibawah Langitmu — Used in the sixth season, created by Anes Bali and sung by Ina with Anes Bali.

Closing song
 Wal Ashri — Used in the sixth season, created by Anes Bali and sung by Ina with Anes Bali.

Marketing
The companies that contracted Deddy Mizwar as their commercials participated as sponsors in this series, including Sarong Atlas, Promag and Yamaha.

The second season featured the most product placements including for information technology sponsors such as Acer (for desktop computers), Tandberg (headsets) and Samsung (monitors and cellular phones). In order to avoid being too flashy when shown on television, the production team chose to censor (blurring) the brands that appeared even though they were physically legible by viewers.

Broadcast
From the first season to the sixth season, Lorong Waktu is aired on SCTV includes reruns. For seasons one to five, this series is aired at the same time as the month of Ramadan. In the first season of the series, it airs at 4:30 PM. For the second season, it is broadcast on the 5 PM slot. Meanwhile, the third season is broadcast after breaking the fast, which is at 6:30 in the evening. From season four to season five, the broadcast was postponed to a later afternoon with a time slot of 3 PM. Finally, for the sixth season, it airs in the period from April to July every Saturday and Sunday with a slot at 6 PM as well as ending the previous scheme which is identical to broadcast in the fasting month. In 2021 the series was re-broadcast by Ajwa TV along with streaming on the vidio.com site, both of which are still the same parent company with SCTV under the Emtek banner.

TVRI once re-aired the third season of Lorong Waktu in the month of Ramadan 2003 with a morning slot at 8 AM so as not to clash with the fourth season which aired on SCTV in the afternoon.

TPI has also broadcast the fourth season of this series in the month of Ramadan 2007 with a broadcast time slot at 12.00 noon.

For city local television, Padjadjaran TV from Bandung has aired the second and third seasons of this series in 2008-2009 with a time slot at 6 PM.

Reception

Critical response
In the view of some conservative Muslim viewers, Lorong Waktu has received a negative response especially because it is considered to have deviated from the Islamic religious tradition regarding time and humans themselves cannot see and change the past or the future. The critics of this series take references from Emha Ainun Nadjib's statement which says that "life is like we are walking in the dark, we will not know what will happen a minute later." Some ustād and Islamic cleric consider that Lorong Waktu is irrelevant to the Quran, which explains that humans cannot see or change their future with a time machine.

One of the episodes that was considered very wrong from Lorong Waktu is in the second season of the fifth episode, where in this episode Haji Husin and Zidan save Sabrina from an assassination attempt by robbers who will enter her house. For the critics, this episode is considered to be misleading, especially for the aqidah of understanding Muslims because it seems that humans can change their destiny through the existence of a time machine, but in fact they cannot.

On the other hand, Lorong Waktu was also greeted positively by many Muslim viewers. The concept of technological advancement combined with religious preaching makes this series unique to Indonesian television viewers. With a story concept that is simple and easy to understand for all ages, this series is considered the best Indonesian religious series of all time. The presence of comedy-type characters such as Havid, Jagur and Jambrong makes this series seem to make the process of preaching that is trying to be conveyed fresher and less rigid.

According to Vice, the series is one of the best Ramadan television series in Indonesia in the late 1990s to the early 2000s. Kompas said Lorong Waktu is the most missed religious television series by its viewers and is considered never stale, even though it has been completed since 2006. Meanwhile, CNN Indonesia called Lorong Waktu as a prima donna series for Indonesian television viewers in the late 1990s.

Jourast Jordy said there was a viewer who changed his belief to become a Muslim after watching the 'simple but powerful da'wah' that appeared in one of the episodes of Lorong Waktu even though the person had to make sacrifices because of the change in belief he had to separate from his family and start a new life.

Accolades

Remake

Deddy Mizwar stated that Lorong Waktu will be remake in the format of animated cartoon series. The new series was released in the month of Ramadan 2019 on SCTV.

References

External links
 Citra Sinema official site
 
 Watch Lorong Waktu on vidio.com

1990s time travel television series
1990s Indonesian television series
1999 Indonesian television series debuts
2000s time travel television series
2000s Indonesian television series
2006 Indonesian television series endings
Indonesian drama television series
Indonesian time travel television series
Television series about Islam
SCTV (TV network) original programming